Rigor Mortis is the debut album by thrash metal band Rigor Mortis released in 1988 through Capitol Records.

Track listing

Personnel
Mike Scaccia - Guitar
Casey Orr  - Bass, Vocals
Harden Harrison - Drums
Bruce Corbitt - Vocals

References

1988 debut albums
Capitol Records albums
Rigor Mortis (band) albums